Las Guías is a corregimiento in Calobre District, Veraguas Province, Panama with a population of 1,712 as of 2010. Its population as of 1990 was 1,789; its population as of 2000 was 1,745.

References

Corregimientos of Veraguas Province